Operation Zebra was a July 1945 major mine clearance operation by U.S. Navy minesweepers off Sakishima Gunto, in association with the invasion of Okinawa by Allied Forces in World War II.

See also
 USS Staunch (AM-307)
 Minesweeper

References

Japan campaign